Max Oaten (born 26 January 1935) is a former Australian rules footballer who played for South Melbourne in the Victorian Football League (VFL).

Oaten, a full-forward from Melton, topped South Melbourne's goal-kicking in 1958 and 1960, with 34 and 39 goals respectively. He kicked his career high six goals in a game on three occasions, including twice in a row to end the 1961 VFL season. In 1960, he represented the VFL's interstate team when they lost to Tasmania for the time ever. Michael Oaten, his son, played briefly at South Melbourne in the early 1980s.

References
Holmesby, Russell and Main, Jim (2007). The Encyclopedia of AFL Footballers. 7th ed. Melbourne: Bas Publishing.

External links

 Max Oaten at Boyles Football Photos.

1935 births
Living people
Sydney Swans players
Melton Football Club players
Australian rules footballers from Victoria (Australia)